PJM Interconnection LLC (PJM) is a regional transmission organization (RTO) in the United States. It is part of the Eastern Interconnection grid operating an electric transmission system serving all or parts of Delaware, Illinois, Indiana, Kentucky, Maryland, Michigan, New Jersey, North Carolina, Ohio, Pennsylvania, Tennessee, Virginia, West Virginia, and the District of Columbia.

PJM, headquartered in Valley Forge, Pennsylvania, was the world's largest competitive wholesale electricity market until the development of the European Integrated Energy Market in the 2000s. More than 1,000 companies are members of PJM, which serves 65 million people and has 185 gigawatts of generating capacity.  With 1,436 electric power generators and 85,103 miles of transmission lines, PJM delivered 783 terawatt-hours of electricity in 2021. 

Started in 1927, the pool was renamed the Pennsylvania-New Jersey-Maryland Interconnection (PJM) in 1956. The organization continues to integrate additional utility transmission systems into its operations.

The Federal Energy Regulatory Commission (FERC) regulates PJM and approves its open access transmission tariff for the wholesale electricity market.

History
In 1927 the Public Service Electric and Gas Company, Philadelphia Electric Company, and Pennsylvania Power & Light Company formed a power pool called the Pennsylvania-New Jersey Interconnection. The purpose of the power pool was to dispatch electric generating plants on a lowest cost basis, thereby reducing the electric costs for all members of the pool. 

After Baltimore Gas and Electric Company and General Public Utilities joined in 1956, the pool was renamed the Pennsylvania-New Jersey-Maryland Interconnection, or PJM.

FERC Orders 888, 889 and 2000
In 1996 - 1999 the FERC made a series of decisions which resulted in the restructuring of the U.S. electric utility industry. The FERC's intention in doing so was to open the wholesale power market to new players, with the hope that spurring competition would save consumers $4 to $5 billion per year and encourage technical innovation in the industry. 

Order No. 888 (Promoting Wholesale Competition Through Open Access Non-discriminatory Transmission Services by Public Utilities; Recovery of Stranded Costs by Public Utilities and Transmitting Utilities) directed utility owners of interstate transmission lines to provide FERC with proposed terms (including fee schedules, or "tariffs") under which new market participants would be granted open, non-discriminatory access to move (or "wheel") power through the existing transmission grid. The FERC also ordered electric utilities to functionally separate transmission operations from their power plant and power marketing businesses. This unbundling of functions was aimed at eliminating conflicts of interest that might exist when the same company owned both the transmission system and the generating plants.  

Order No. 889 (Open Access Same-Time Information System) was designed to further level the playing field. It required the creation of an electronic system to ensure that all participants in the wholesale power market  - new players and traditional electric utilities - had access to the same information about available transmission capacity and prices. 

The FERC also endorsed the concept of appointing independent system operators (ISOs) to coordinate, control, and monitor the operation of electrical power systems, usually within a single US state - a function that was traditionally the responsibility of vertically integrated electric utility companies. PJM became an ISO in 1997. The concept of an independent system operator evolved into that of regional transmission organizations (RTOs). FERC's intention was that all U.S. companies owning interstate electric transmission lines would place those facilities under the control of an RTO. In its Order No. 2000 (Regional Transmission Organizations), issued in 1999, FERC specified the minimum capabilities that an RTO should possess in order for the competitive generation market to function as intended. PJM was designated an RTO by the FERC in 2001.

Deregulation and expansion, 2002
In April 2002, Allegheny Power (AP) was the first external control area to join the PJM RTO as a market participant; "PJM Classic" and AP operated as a single control area, filling the roles of balancing authority, interchange authority, market operator and transmission operator.

The Northeast Blackout of 2003
During the Northeast Blackout of 2003, the transmission systems within the PJM operations area largely remained operational and were not affected by the power failure.  When the grid separated, a small portion of the Public Service Electric & Gas of New Jersey zone electrically separated from the Eastern Interconnection due to over-frequency relay operations.

Deregulation and expansion, 2004-present
In May 2004, Commonwealth Edison (ComEd) joined PJM as a separate balancing authority operating under the RTO.  PJM was able to manage the two territories in a single market by a mechanism known as "the pathway", a set of firm contracts that transferred energy from ComEd through third party control areas to the eastern PJM markets and beyond.  In October 2004, American Electric Power (AEP) and Dayton Power & Light (DPL) joined PJM, which allowed PJM to collapse back into a single control area.  

In January 2005, Duquesne Light Co. (DLCO) joined PJM. In May 2005, Dominion Virginia Power joined PJM, extending the southern border to North Carolina.  FirstEnergy was added to PJM in June 2011, expanding the footprint across northern Ohio to the Michigan border.  Areas of Ohio and Kentucky near Cincinnati covered by Duke Energy joined the PJM footprint in January 2012. In 2018, the Ohio Valley Electric Corporation (OVEC) integrated into PJM.  At this time, PJM now borders 22 balancing authorities representing eleven market interfaces.

Transmission system planning and upgrades
PJM uses a fifteen-year planning horizon for planning transmission system upgrades. Under PJM's Regional Transmission Expansion Planning (RTEP) process, PJM considers forecasts of load growth and additions of demand response, interconnection requests for new and planned retirements of existing generating plants, and possible solutions to mitigate congestion on the transmission system. If the upgrade involves the construction of a new transmission line, local siting decisions involving the route of the new line are determined by the owner of the line and the state government.

Generation types
As the largest RTO in North America, PJM has a significant role to play in reducing grid emissions.  PJM has "facilitating decarbonization" as one of its three strategic pillars.

PJM presents hourly a pie chart of its energy sources on the main page of its website. It also provides access  to an historical hour by hour database of generation by fuel type, summarized here for 2022.

PJM seriously lags the rest of the country in adding renewable energy.  According to the Energy Information Administration (EIA), in 2021 nationwide 12% of US electric energy was produced by wind and solar.  Even a year later in 2022, PJM produced only 4.7% by wind and solar, as seen in the table above, although the PJM Independent Market Monitor reported wind and solar accounted for 6.8% of PJM energy in 2022,.  which still lags the rest of the country significantly..

Renewable backlog
 due to the volume of applications from renewable energy projects PJM has experienced difficulty in evaluating and integrating proposed new projects into its system. This may result in delays in utilization of significant projects that are being built or are planned, delaying the achievement of President Biden's goal of 100 percent carbon-free electricity by 2035. Transition to renewables may also be slowed by features of the PJM pricing models.  In an August 2021 letter, the PJM PIEOUG (Public Interest and Environmental Organizations User Group) expressed concern that the capacity market resulted in “unintentional subsidies for fossil fueled resources or barriers to low carbon supply.” 

PJM is aware of the large backlog and slow pace in processing generation interconnection (GI) requests, and requested  significant changes to its interconnection process, described by PJM as: “... a comprehensive reform of the PJM interconnection process designed to more efficiently and timely process New Service Requests by transitioning from a serial “first-come, first-served” queue approach to a “first-ready, first-served” Cycle approach utilized by other regional transmission organizations (“RTOs”) and stand-alone transmission providers. ”  

FERC approved the new GI process 11/29/22.  The PJM press release announcing FERC approval states “The proposal was widely supported by PJM stakeholders, who had worked with PJM to develop the new rules since the April 2021 inception of the Interconnection Process Reform Task Force.”  However, one major stakeholder, the Organization of PJM States, in its comments on the PJM proposal, indicated its recommendation for FERC approval was despite the process being “too slow”, and based on the expectation that much more was to be done to speed up interconnections.

Pricing
Prices are set in PJM by its operation of two markets: an energy market and a capacity market .

Energy Market
The energy market   sets prices, paid to generators and paid by consumers, for the many GWhrs of electrical energy delivered on the PJM grid.  The price is determined by using nodal pricing, also known as locational marginal pricing. PJM publishes a map of energy price levels throughout its area.

Capacity Market
“PJM's capacity market, called the Reliability Pricing Model, ensures long-term grid reliability.”  Market participants are paid for their promise to be able to generate electricity (or reduce demand) three years in the future.  FERC approved a December 2022 PJM proposal to adjust its capacity market operations.  However, in a 2/21/23 press release  FERC noted “continuing disputes and frequent complaints about how PJM operates its capacity markets from an array of stakeholders” and FERC stated it will “examine the PJM Interconnection, L.L.C. capacity market and how best to guarantee it achieves the objective of ensuring resource adequacy at just and reasonable rates.” In response to this stated  FERC intent, and in the belief “near-term changes to the Reliability Pricing Model (RPM) are necessary to ensure that PJM can maintain resource adequacy into the future”, the PJM board “decided to implement the Critical Issue Fast Path (CIFP) accelerated stakeholder process mechanism to further pursue stakeholder consensus that would inform a PJM Board decision on a potential FERC filing targeted for October 1, 2023.” 

The amount of capacity OPM purchases (and passes costs along to customers) is the amount it needs to serve expected peak load plus a margin to cover possible delivery interruptions such as generator or transmission outages.  The peak load in 2022 was 147,820 MW on July 20.  PJM forecasts peak load to increase to 160,971 MW in 2033 and reach 167,567 MW in 2038 .   As of June 2022, PJM’s stated capacity was 198,152 MW,   which is substantially greater than any peak load ever experienced, or any peak load forecast.  One analysis  concluded that PJM has been purchasing capacity significantly in excess of load plus target reserve margins, which resulted in “consumers paying for more capacity than needed, retaining older capacity that is no longer needed and should be retired, and acquiring new power plants that are not yet needed.” In its “State of the Market Report for PJM” for 2022 , The PJM Independent Market Monitor found that noncompetitive outcomes in the capacity market “led to customers being overcharged by a combined $1.454 billion” in the two year period analyzed.

References

External links
PJM Interconnection website
PJM LMP Map
PJM Interregional Data Map 

Electric power transmission system operators in the United States